Ritam (trans. Rhythm) was a Yugoslav music magazine. Prior to the appearance of Ritam, there were Yugoslav magazines dedicated to jazz, but Ritam, founded in 1962, was the first Yugoslav magazine which dealt with jazz as well as rock and pop music, thus paving the way for Yugoslav rock magazines like Džuboks and Pop Express.

History
Ritam magazine was founded in 1962 by publisher Dnevnik from Novi Sad. It was dedicated to jazz and popular music. The editor-in-chief was poet Miroslav "Mika" Antić. The first issue was released on October 1, 1962. The price of an issue was 50 dinars. Before August 1965, which was when the last issue was published, 39 issues have been released in total.

References

1962 establishments in Yugoslavia
1965 disestablishments in Yugoslavia
Defunct magazines published in Yugoslavia
Eastern Bloc mass media
Magazines established in 1962
Magazines disestablished in 1965
Mass media in Novi Sad
Serbian-language magazines
Magazines published in Yugoslavia
Yugoslav rock music